Boy is a 1987 compilation album from Swedish pop singer Lena Philipsson.

Track listing
"Åh Amadeus" – 3.35
"Vindarnas väg" – 3.42
"Sommartid" – 3.38
"När jag behöver dig som mest" – 4.21
"Kärleken är evig" – 3.03
"Segla" – 3.55
"Boy" – 2.50
"Oskuldens ögon" – 4.30
"Dansa i neon" – 3.20
"Jag känner (Ti Sento)" – 4.01
"Det går väl an" – 3.54
"Cheerio" – 3.51

References

1987 compilation albums
Lena Philipsson compilation albums